Buraly (Buralı) is a rural locality (a village) in Nizhnekachmashevsky Selsoviet, Kaltasinsky District, Bashkortostan, Russia. The population was 34 as of 2010. There is 1 street.

Geography 
Buraly is located 5 km west of Kaltasy (the district's administrative centre) by road. Kaltasy is the nearest rural locality.

References 

Rural localities in Kaltasinsky District